Aleksandër Vasi (born 13 April 1968) is an Albanian footballer. He played in three matches for the Albania national football team in 1992.

References

External links
 

1968 births
Living people
Albanian footballers
Albania international footballers
Place of birth missing (living people)
Association footballers not categorized by position